Cathy Konrad (born June 29, 1963) is an American film and television producer who has produced nineteen feature films including critically acclaimed films such as Golden Globe-winner Walk the Line, 3:10 to Yuma, Girl, Interrupted, Kids and the Scream tetralogy. Since 2011, she has been working exclusively on TV. In 1999, she married film producer James Mangold; they have two sons. In 2014, the couple announced that they were divorcing. Konrad is credited as an executive producer for the former MTV and now, VH1 series Scream.

Filmography
She was a producer in all films unless otherwise noted.

Film

Miscellaneous crew

Thanks

Television

Miscellaneous crew

References

External links

Living people
American film producers
1963 births
American television producers
American women television producers
Golden Globe Award-winning producers
American women film producers
21st-century American women